Rheocles is a genus of Madagascar rainbowfish. Rheocles has a restricted distribution, being found only in certain forested freshwater habitats in the central and eastern highlands of Madagascar including the Nosivolo River. The genus appears to feed almost exclusively on allochthonous material, primarily insects falling onto the water surface.

Taxonomy
In a 1990 study, this genus is monophyletic. However, in a 2004 analysis, it was found that Rheocles was paraphyletic, forming two distinct clades. R. alaotrensis, R. lateralis, and R. wrightae (all species that are not discernibly sexually dimorphic was recovered as the sister taxon of the rest of the bedotiids, including Bedotia sister to R. vatosa + R. derhami. R. pellegrini and R. sikorae were excluded from this study due to lack of available material, however, R. sikorae is considered to be the sister taxon to R. wrightae.

Species
There are currently seven recognized species in this genus:
 Rheocles alaotrensis (Pellegrin, 1914) (Katrana)
 Rheocles derhami Stiassny & D. M. Rodríguez, 2001
 Rheocles lateralis Stiassny & Reinthal, 1992
 Rheocles pellegrini (Nichols & La Monte, 1931)
 Rheocles sikorae (Sauvage, 1891)
 Rheocles vatosoa Stiassny, D. M. Rodríguez & Loiselle, 2002
 Rheocles wrightae Stiassny, 1990

Description
Rheocles species are robust bedotiids with little lateral body compression. R. vatosa and R. derhami are sexually dimorphic, with males exhibiting larger adult size, enhanced coloration and pigmentation, as well as pronounced development of the unpaired fins.

Conservation
Its close association with forested biotopes suggests that, like so many other rainforest-adapted series, Rheocles is extremely vulnerable to deforestation pressure.

References

 
Bedotiinae
Taxa named by David Starr Jordan
Taxa named by Carl Leavitt Hubbs
Endemic fauna of Madagascar
Ray-finned fish genera